Bugtirhinus was a genus of rhinoceros of the subfamily Elasmotheriinae endemic to Asia during the Miocene living from 20—16.9 mya existing for approximately .

Taxonomy
Bugtirhinus was named by Antoine and Welcomme (2000). Its type is Bugtirhinus praecursor. It was assigned to Elasmotheriini by Antoine and Welcomme (2000); and to Iranotheriinae by Guérin and Pickford (2003).

References

Miocene rhinoceroses
Miocene mammals of Asia